Smithson is a small lunar impact crater located in the northeast part of Mare Fecunditatis. It is a circular, cup-shaped feature with a slightly higher albedo than the surrounding, dark lunar mare. It was previously identified as Taruntius N before being renamed by the IAU. Taruntius itself lies to the west-northwest, in the northwestern part of the same mare.

References

 
 
 
 
 
 
 
 
 
 
 
 

Impact craters on the Moon